VEX Robotics is a robotics program for elementary through university students, and a subset of Innovation First International. The VEX Robotics competitions and programs are managed by the Robotics Education and Competition Foundation (RECF). In April 2018, VEX Robotics Competition was named the largest robotics competition in the world by Guinness World Records.

There are three leagues of VEX robotics competitions meant for different age groups and skill levels:
VEX V5 (previously VEX EDR) is for middle and high school students. VEX V5 Robotics teams have an opportunity to compete annually in the VEX Robotics Competition (VRC)
VEX IQ is for elementary and middle school students. VEX IQ robotics teams have an opportunity to compete annually in the VEX IQ Competition (VIQC).
 VEX AI is an advanced robotics program for high school and university students. The pilot program registration is scheduled to open to university students in fall of 2020. VEX AI robotics teams will have an opportunity to compete in the VEX AI Competition (VAIC).

In each of the three leagues, students are given a new challenge annually, and must design, build, program, and drive a robot to complete the challenge as best as they can. The robotics teams that consistently display exceptional mastery in all of these areas will eventually progress to the VEX Robotics World Championship.

The description and rules for the season's competition are released during the world championship of the previous season. Starting in 2021, the VEX Robotics World Championship will be held in Dallas, Texas each year in mid April or mid May, depending on which VEX team you're on.

VEX V5 
VEX V5 is a STEM learning system designed by VEX Robotics and the REC Foundation to help middle and high school students develop problem-solving and computational thinking skills. It was introduced at the VEX Robotics World Championship in April 2019 as a replacement for a previous system called VEX EDR. The program utilizes the VEX V5 Construction and Control System as a standardized hardware, firmware, and software compatibility platform. Robotics teams and clubs can use the VEX V5 system to build robots to compete in the annual VEX Robotics Competition.

Construction and Control System 
The VEX V5 Construction and Control System is a metal-based robotics platform with machinable, bolt-together pieces that can be used to construct custom robotic mechanisms. The robot is controlled by a programmable processor known as the VEX V5 Brain. The Brain is equipped with a color LCD touchscreen, 21 hardware ports, an SD card port, a battery port, 8 legacy sensor ports, and a micro-USB programming port. Usage with a VEX V5 Radio enables wireless driving and wireless programming of the brain via the VEX V5 Controller. The controller allows wireless user input to the robot brain, and two controllers can be daisy-chained if necessary. Each controller has two hardware ports, a micro-USB port, two 2-axis joysticks, a monochrome LCD display, and twelve buttons. The controller's LCD can be written wirelessly from the robot, providing users with configurable feedback from the robot brain. The VEX V5 Motors connect to the brain via the hardware ports and are equipped with an internal optical shaft encoder to provide feedback on the rotational status of the motor. The motor's speed is programmable, but may also be altered by exchanging the internal gear cartridge with one of three cartridges of different gear ratios. The three cartridges are 100 rpm, 200 rpm, and 600 rpm.

VEXcode V5 
VEXcode V5 is a Scratch-based coding environment designed by VEX Robotics for programming VEX Robotics hardware, such as the VEX V5 Brain. The block-style interface makes programming simple for elementary through high-school students. VEXcode is consistent across VEX 123, GO, IQ and V5, and can be used to program the devices from each. VEXcode allows the block programs to be viewed as equivalent C++ or programs, to help more advanced students transition from blocks to text. This also allows easy interconversion between text-based and block-based programming.

PROS 
PROS is a C/C++ programming environment for VEX V5 hardware maintained by students of Purdue University through Purdue ACM SIGBots. It provides a more bare-bones environment for more knowledgeable students that allows for an industry-applicable experience. It has a more robust API that allows for more precise control of the hardware for competition-level uses in VRC/VEX U. It is based on FreeRTOS.

VEX Robotics Competition

VEX Robotics Competition (VRC) is a robotics competition for registered middle and high school teams which utilizes the VEX V5 Construction and Control System. In this competition, teams design, build, and program robots to compete at tournaments. At tournaments, teams participate in qualifying matches where two randomly chosen alliances of two teams each compete for the highest team ranking. Before the Elimination Rounds, the top-ranking teams choose their permanent alliance partners, starting with the highest ranked team, and continuing until the alliance capacity for the tournament is reached. The new alliances then compete in an elimination bracket, and the tournament champions, alongside other award winners, qualify, for their regional culminating event. .

The current challenge is VEX Robotics Competition: Spin Up.

General rules 
Middle and high school students have the same game and rules. The most general and basic rules for the VEX Robotics Competition are as follows, but each year may have exceptions and/or additional constraints.
 Each robot is partnered with another robot in a pair called an "alliance". In any given match, each alliance competes against one other alliance. One team is designated as the red alliance, and the other as the blue alliance.
 No robot may exceed the dimensions of an 18-inch cube until the match has begun.
 No robot may contain hardware, software, material, or content that is not distributed by or explicitly allowed by VEX Robotics.
 The playing field consists of a 12 foot by 12 foot square of foam tiles bordered by a wall of metal-framed polycarbonate dividers. Anything outside of these border walls is considered as off of the playing field. The various props associated with that season's competition are arranged in a defined and reproducible manner before the start of each mach.
 At the start of the match is a 15-second 'autonomous' period, where all four robots navigate the field based on pre-programmed instructions, without live driver input.
 After the autonomous period has ended, the 'driver control' period begins. This stage of the match consists of one minute and forty-five seconds of manual control of the robot using one or two handheld controllers, utilized by the respective number of 'drivers'. Note: During a match, up to three competitors per robot may be on their alliance's side of the field, outside of the field border, in an area designated as their alliance's 'alliance station'. The field's two alliance stations are more commonly known as 'the driver pits', or simply 'the pits'.
 The object of the match is to attain a higher score, i.e. more points, than the opposing alliance. The method by which the alliances attain these points varies significantly with each season.
 Throughout the match, the blue alliance is not allowed to enter the red alliance's 'protected zone' of the field, and vice versa. The designated areas of the field are often different for each season. However, during the autonomous period, the protected zone normally consists of the half of the field where the alliance starts, whereas the driver control period occasionally does not even define a protected zone, as was the case for VRC Tipping Point. Any robot that repeatedly, extensively, and/or intentionally enters the opposing alliance's protected zone will be given a warning, be forced to forfeit the match, and/or be disqualified from the tournament.
 Intentionally removing game objects from the field will result in a warning, match forfeit and/or, if necessary, disqualification.
 Intentionally and repeatedly damaging any of the robots involved, either during the match or otherwise, will result in immediate disqualification.

Current game: Spin Up  

VEX Robotics Competition Spin Up is played on a 12’x12’ square field configured as seen above. Two Alliances – one “red” and one “blue” – composed of two Teams each, compete in matches consisting of a fifteen second Autonomous Period, followed by a one minute and forty-five second Driver Controlled Period.

There are sixty Discs and four Rollers on a VRC Spin Up Field. Discs can be Scored in the two High Goals, one per Alliance, at opposite corners of the field.  Each Disc scored in a High Goal is worth 5 points. However, Robots aiming for the High Goal had better be accurate!  Because underneath each High Goal, is a 1-point Low Goal for the opposing Alliance.

In addition to Discs, Robots can also spin the four Rollers mounted to the field perimeter.  If the area inside of a Roller’s pointers only shows one color, that is considered “Owned” by that Alliance.  Each Owned Roller is worth 10 points at the end of the match.

As the clock winds down, it’s time for the Endgame. At the end of the Match, Alliances will receive a 3 point bonus for each tile their Robots are Covering. So, during the last 10 seconds of the Match, there are no horizontal expansion limits.

The Alliance that scores more points in the Autonomous period is awarded with ten bonus points, added to the final score at the end of the match. Each Alliance also has the opportunity to earn an Autonomous Win Point by scoring at least two Discs in Alliance’s High Goals, and owning Both Rollers on their side of the field. This Bonus can be earned by both Alliances, regardless of who wins the Autonomous Bonus

Previous games
Previous VEX Robotics Competition games have included, from 2021 to 2022 backwards, Tipping Point, Change-Up, Tower Takeover, Turning Point, In The Zone, Starstruck, Nothing But Net, Skyrise, Toss Up, Sack Attack, Gateway, Round Up, Clean Sweep, Elevation, and Bridge Battle.

VEX IQ Challenge

The VEX IQ Challenge, presented by the Robotics Education & Competition Foundation, provides elementary and middle school students with exciting, open-ended robotics and research project challenges that enhance their science, technology, engineering, and mathematics (STEM) skills through hands-on, student-centered learning. A VEX IQ Robotics set is used, with plastic pieces that snap together using pegs, and it is extremely easy to construct a robot. The students use a graphical software to program the robot. There are two parts to the contests: Robot Skills, which is a single robot trying to score as many points as possible, and the Teamwork Challenge, where two robots attempt to work together to complete the same task.

Current Game: Slapshot

2022-2023 
VEX IQ Competition Slapshot is played on a 6’ x 8’ rectangular field configured as seen above. Two robots compete in the Teamwork Challenge as an alliance in 60 second long teamwork matches, working collaboratively to score points.

Teams also compete in the Robot Skills Challenge where one robot takes the field to score as many points as possible. These matches consist of Driving Skills Matches, which will be entirely driver controlled, and Programming Skills Matches, which will be autonomous with limited human interaction.

The scoring objects in VEX IQ Competition Slapshot are 2.5” (6.35 cm) diameter Discs. There are a total of (45) Discs on the field. The object of the game is to score as many points as possible with your alliance partner by scoring Discs in Goal Zones, removing Discs and touching Contact Zones at the end of the Match.

Previous games

2021-2022: Pitching In 

VEX IQ Challenge Pitching In is played on a six foot by eight foot rectangular field. Two robots compete in the teamwork challenge as an alliance in one-minute long teamwork matches, and a 15 second period of autonomous working collaboratively to score points. Teams also compete in the robot skills challenge where one robot attempts to score as many points as possible. These matches consist of driving skills matches, which will be entirely driver controlled, and programming skills matches, which will be autonomous with limited human interaction.

The object of the game is to attain the highest score by scoring balls in either a low scoring goal or a high scoring goal in the center of the field.  Additional points are scored by clearing the starting corrals of all balls and by parking via hanging on either a low or high bar on either side of the field.

2020–21: Rise Above 

VEX IQ Challenge Rise Above is played on a six foot by eight foot rectangular field. Two robots compete in the teamwork challenge as an alliance in one-minute long teamwork matches, working collaboratively to score points. Teams also compete in the robot skills challenge where one robot attempts to score as many points as possible. These matches consist of driving skills matches, which will be entirely driver controlled, and programming skills matches, which will be autonomous with limited human interaction.

The object of the game is to attain the highest score by scoring risers in the goal. There are a total of 27 risers, nine for each color (orange, purple and teal).

2019–20: Squared Away 

VEX IQ Challenge Squared Away is played on a four-foot by eight-foot rectangular field. The scoring objects in are three-inch diameter balls and seven-inch cubes. There are a total of 35 balls and seven cubes on the field. The object of the game is to score as many points as possible with your alliance partner in one of two ways: by scoring balls in or on cubes, and by moving cubes to their respective scoring zones.

2018–19: Next Level 

VEX IQ Challenge Next Level is played on a four-foot by eight-foot rectangular field. The object of the game is to attain the highest score by scoring and stacking colored hubs in building zones, removing bonus hubs from the hanging structure, and by parking or hanging on the hanging bar. There are two building zones in the corners of the field, and in the middle there is one hanging structure. There are total of fifteen hubs, plus two bonus hubs available to be scored in the building zones and one parking zone in the middle of the field.

2017–18: Ringmaster 

VEX IQ Challenge Ringmaster is played on a four-foot by eight-foot rectangular field. The object of the game is to attain the highest score by scoring colored rings on the floor goal and on posts, by having uniform posts, by emptying starting pegs, and by releasing the bonus tray. There are a total of 28 hexballs available as scoring objects in the game. There are two scoring zones, sixteen low goals, twelve elevated goals, and one bridge on the field.

2016–17: Crossover 

VEX IQ Challenge Crossover is played on a four-foot by eight-foot rectangular field. The object of the game is to attain the highest score by scoring hexballs in their colored scoring zone and goals, and by parking and balancing robots on the bridge. There are a total of 28 hexballs available as scoring objects in the game. There are two scoring zones, sixteen low goals, twelve elevated goals, and one bridge on the field.

2015–16: Bank Shot 

VEX IQ Challenge Bank Shot is played on a four-foot by eight-foot rectangular field. The object of the game is to attain the highest score by emptying cutouts, scoring balls into the scoring zone and goals, and by parking robots on the ramp. There are a total of 44 balls available as scoring objects in the game. There is one scoring zone, one goal, one ramp, and sixteen cutouts on the field.

2014–15: Highrise 

VEX IQ Challenge Highrise is played on a four-foot by eight-foot rectangular field. The object of the game is to attain the highest possible score by scoring cubes in the scoring zone and by building highrises of cubes of the same color on the highrise bases. There are a total of 36 cubes, twelve of each of three colors, available as scoring objects in the game. There is one scoring zone and three highrise bases on the field. Each robot begins a match on one of two starting positions and must occupy a space of less than 13 by 19 by 15 inches.

2013–14: Add It Up 

VEX IQ Challenge Add It Up is played on a four-foot by eight-foot rectangular field. The object of the game is to attain the highest possible alliance score by scoring your small and large BuckyBalls into the floor, low and high goals, filling scoring rings, and having robots hang from hanging bar at the end of the match. There are a total of 36 small BuckyBalls and four large BuckyBalls available as scoring objects in the game. There are four floor goals, two low goals, two high goals, and four scoring rings, as well as a hanging bar.

2012–13: Rings-N-Things 

VEX IQ Challenge Rings-N-Things was the Pilot Program for the VEX IQ Challenge robotics competition program, which launched in April 2012. The game is played on a four-foot by eight-foot field, surrounded by a 3.5 inch tall perimeter. There are four goals and eight rings into which teams can score 36 balls. The field is divided by the ramp.

VEX U
The VEX U level competition is a robotics competition for college and university students that uses the VEX Robotics hardware and V5 electronics. The rules are nearly identical for this competition as for the VEX Robotics Competition, but VEX U teams are allowed to take advantage of more customization and greater flexibility than other levels (teams are granted the ability to use 3D printers and use raw materials such as sheet metal and wood). This allows VEX U teams to have more customization on their robots, and construct mechanisms that cannot be created solely via the VEX Robotics hardware. Also, their robot creation is limited by the need to find effective costs and a restricted development environment in order to model a real-world situation. Additionally rather than being limited to a robot size of an 18-inch cube, VEX U contestants had the freedom to use up to a 24-inch cube of space for their larger robot, and up to a 15-inch cube for their smaller robot (thus each team builds 2 robots, and competes against another team's two robots).

The VEX U competition, although very similar to the VEX Robotics Competition, has some distinct rules. The autonomous period of VEX U competitions is also longer, lasting forty-five seconds versus the fifteen for the VEX Robotics Competition. As a result, the driver control period is shortened to a period of seventy-five seconds, immediately after the autonomous period has been scored and the autonomous bonus has been awarded to the correct alliance, to keep matches at a length of two minutes.

VEX AI

On April 25, 2020, VEX Robotics and the REC Foundation announced a new platform of competitions, the VEX AI Competition. The new platforms will use the VEX V5 Construction and Control System, and registration will be available to high school and college teams.

The competition is fully autonomous and will use an array of new sensors including the VEX Game Positioning System (VEX GPS); VEX AI microprocessor; VEX AI Vision Sensor with depth perception; VEX LINK, a wireless robot-to-robot communications interface; and the VEX Sensor Fusion Map, a new multi-sensor integration technology which uses sensory data from the robots to render the course in real-time 3D. Each team will build and program two robots. Teams will be able to 3D print and machine parts, use custom electronics, and utilize an unlimited quantity of motors.

The pilot program is scheduled to open for registration to university students in the fall of 2020. After registration begins, any high school teams that wish to participate must apply for program admission. Unlike university participants, only those high school teams that show exceptional preparedness for this level of advanced competition will be allowed to compete. VEX AI robotics teams will be able to compete in the VEX AI Competition. Unlike VEX U, this competition will be completely separate from the VRC Competition.

VEX Robotics World Championship 
The VEX Robotics World Championship brings together qualifying teams from the two VEX Robotics programs: the VEX IQ Challenge, VEX Robotics Competition, with the VEX AI Competition bringing the number to three in 2022. The championship is an international celebration of the robotics community and a final tournament to crown the VEX World Champions in each league. The 2021–24 championships are scheduled to be held in Dallas, Texas.

A one-hour special version of the 2016 VEX Robotics World Championship aired on ESPN2 in June 2016. CBS aired a one-hour special version of the 2017 VEX Robotics World Championship on June 11.

During the VEX Robotics World Championship, a "Parade of Nations" is held and includes hundreds of students, often dressed in costumes, from more than thirty countries.

The 2020 VEX Robotics World Championship was canceled due to the COVID-19 pandemic. On March 30, 2020, VEX Robotics and the REC Foundation announced they would host the first-ever VEX Robotics Virtual World Celebration on April 25, 2020. The event celebrated the accomplishments of all teams and revealed the 2020–21 VEX Robotics Competition and VEX IQ Challenge. During this event, VEX Robotics and the REC Foundation also hosted a Fantasy Robotics simulation for all levels in the VEX Robotics Program, using statistics from state and qualifying tournaments. On January 20, 2021, the REC Foundation along with VEX Robotics announced that due to the COVID-19 pandemic the 2021 VEX World Championships would be modified to an online remote tournament and would also include remote skills matches. Therefore, also announcing that the event will have no in-person attendance.

Role in pedagogy 
VEX Robotics competitions have been of interest to educators as a way of stimulating students' interest in hands-on learning, engineering, and computer programming. The Department of Engineering and Technology Education at Utah State University has created a Design Academy with a curriculum for teaching skills through participation in a VEX Robotics Competition. In addition, VEX Robotics provides two other programs aiming to introduce these skills at an early age in the classroom: VEX 123, and VEX Go.

VEX 123 
VEX 123 is a VEX Robotics program aimed to introduce basic turtle-style programming to young students in kindergarten through second grade. It uses a small round robot with a front, wheels, and an audio speaker, (the '123 Robot') which is programmed to drive around a plastic course using either a handheld wireless programming module (the 'Coder') or a mobile device (not included) with Scratch-based programming software. The course is modular and can be built differently to present different programming challenges. VEX provides multiple pre-prepared STEM Labs designed for different classroom settings, such as language arts and mathematics. The VEX 123 STEM Labs are "designed to provoke STEM thinking and spark creative problem-solving ideas."

VEX GO 
VEX GO is a robotics program that introduces robotics to students in third grade and upwards. GO is designed to be an affordable construction system for teaching the fundamentals of STEM through engaging, collaborative, and hands-on activities that help young students learn coding and engineering concepts.

References

External links

 VEX Homepage
 Event Calendar

Student robotics competitions
Robotics in the United States